Gornja Toponica is a village in the municipality of Prokuplje, Serbia. According to the 2002 census, the village has a population of 60 people.
It the site of a mental institution that houses about 1,000 patients.

References

Populated places in Toplica District